Sydney Zoo is a zoo in Bungarribee in the Western Sydney Parklands, in Greater Western Sydney, New South Wales, Australia. It occupies a  site. Sydney Zoo is a member of the Zoos and Aquariums Association of Australia and New Zealand.

Development 
Sydney Zoo was founded in 2015 with an aim to introduce local and international visitors to a range of animal species from all over the world, while also educating on animal welfare and conservation. The zoo has formed a partnership with the Western Sydney University and TAFE NSW.

Sydney Zoo's senior curatorial and animal acquisition team includes current and former presidents of the NSW Fauna and Marine Parks Association (NSW FMPA) and the current president of the International Congress of Zoos (ICZ).

The zoo is subject to the oversight of government agencies including the Animal Welfare Unit of the NSW Department of Primary Industries (DPI) and the key zoo industry body in Australasia, the Zoo and Aquarium Association (ZAA). The zoo's social programs include school education programs and aboriginal employment. Specific infrastructure to assist in the delivery of these programs includes veterinary facilities, quarantine facilities, extensive feed preparation and storage areas, an educational amphitheatre and disability access.

Exhibits 

Sydney Zoo's exhibit sizes exceed NSW Department of Primary Industries standards by an average of 2.6 times. Sydney Zoo includes over 30 exhibits and a variety of animal species both exotic and Australian native kept in different focus precinct alphabetically listed below.

Africa

 African lion
 African wild dog
 Cape porcupine
 Cheetah
 Dromedary camel
 Giraffe
 Meerkat
 Nyala
 Ostrich
 Plains zebra
 Southern white rhinoceros
 Spotted hyena

Aquarium

 Alligator snapping turtle
 Australian bass
 Banded rainbowfish
 Barbour's seahorse
 Barramundi
 Bicolour blenny
 Black phantom tetra
 Black-axil puller
 Blacktail humbug
 Bull shark
 Cleaner shrimp
 Common clownfish
 Common yabby
 Coral cardinalfish
 Crimson-spotted rainbowfish
 Dusky surgeonfish
 Dwarf hawkish
 Eastern long-necked turtle
 Eastern water dragon
 Eel-tailed catfish
 Emperor tetra
 Fork-tailed catfish
 Freshwater angelfish
 Giant glassfish
 Glowlight tetra
 Golden perch
 Golden-head sleeper goby
 Gulf saratoga
 Indo-Pacific tarpon
 Jade perch
 Leopard wrasse
 Little penguin
 Longfin eel
 Mandarinfish
 Milkfish
 Mono
 Morrison's dragonfish
 Murray cod
 Murray River rainbowfish
 Neon tetra
 Olive perchlet
 Orange-spot surgeonfish
 Pacific blue-eye
 Peppermint shrimp
 Pig-nosed turtle
 Pink anemonefish
 Red rainbowfish
 Red-spotted blenny
 Rummy-nose tetra
 Saltwater crocodile
 Sand-sifting sea star
 Seven-spot archerfish
 Silver perch
 Sixline wrasse
 Snakehead gudgeon
 Spotted scat
 Western carp gudgeon
 Yellow boxfish
 Yellow coral goby
 Yellow-eyed mullet
 Zebra dartfish

Asia

 Asian elephant
 Asian small-clawed otter
 Red panda
 Sumatran orangutan
 Tiger

Australia

 Common wombat
 Dingo
 Emu
 Kangaroo Island kangaroo
 Koala
 Red kangaroo
 Red-necked wallaby
 Southern cassowary
 Swamp wallaby
 Tammar wallaby
 Tasmanian devil
 Yellow-footed rock wallaby

Australia Building

Middle Corridor
 Australian green tree frog
 Centralian knob-tailed gecko
 Flinders Ranges scorpion
 Goliath stick insect
 Green and golden bell frog
 Magnificent tree frog
Northern leaf-tailed gecko
 Spiny katydid insect
 Spiny leaf insect
 Nocturnal Australia
 Bilby
 Common ringtail possum
 Eastern quoll
 Fat-tailed dunnart
 Feathertail glider
 Ghost bat
 Long-nosed potoroo
 Spinifex hopping mouse
 Squirrel glider
 Yellow-bellied glider
 Reptile House
 Australian scrub python
 Black-headed monitor
 Boyd's forest dragon
 Broad-headed snake
 Burn's dragon
 Central netted dragon
 Centralian carpet python
 Common death adder
 Diamond carpet python
 Eastern brown snake
 Frill necked lizard
 Green tree python
 Heath monitor
 Inland taipan
 Lace monitor
 Mertens' water monitor
 Perentie
 Pygmy spiny-tailed skink
 Red-bellied black snake
 Rough-scaled python
 Shingleback skink
 Tiger snake

Primate Boulevard

 Black-capped capuchin monkey
 Bolivian squirrel monkey
 Chimpanzee
 Hamadryas baboon
 (Capybara also live in an exhibit in this area of the zoo)

See also

 Louise Grossfeldt (Sydney Zoo's primates curator)
 Taronga Zoo
 Featherdale Wildlife Park

References

External links

 
Quick Guide

Zoos in New South Wales
Buildings and structures in Sydney
Parks in Sydney
Zoos established in 2019
2019 establishments in Australia
Tourist attractions in Sydney